Oscar Denton (born July 30, 1953) is an American politician who has served in the Mississippi House of Representatives from the 55th district since 2013.

References

1953 births
Living people
Politicians from Vicksburg, Mississippi
Democratic Party members of the Mississippi House of Representatives
21st-century American politicians